Sir Charles Wyville Thomson  (5 March 1830 – 10 March 1882) was a Scottish natural historian and marine zoologist. He served as the chief scientist on the Challenger expedition; his work there revolutionized oceanography and led to his being knighted.

Life
Thomson was born at Bonsyde, in Linlithgow, West Lothian, on 5 March 1830, the son of Andrew Thomson, a surgeon in the service of the East India Company, and his wife Sarah Ann Drummond Smith. He was baptised Wyville Thomas Charles Thomson, but changed his name formally upon being knighted in 1876.

He was educated under Charles Chalmers at Merchiston Castle School, then from 1845 studied medicine at the University of Edinburgh graduating with an MD. However, his focus turned from medicine to natural science, and he joined the Botanical Society of Edinburgh in 1847, and soon after became secretary to the Royal Physical Society of Edinburgh. In 1850 he was attending the botany class of John Hutton Balfour at the University.

In 1850 he was appointed lecturer of botany, and in 1851 professor of botany, at the University of Aberdeen. In 1853 he became a professor of natural history in Queen's College, Cork, Ireland, succeeding Professor Hincks. A year later he was nominated to the chair of mineralogy and geology at the Queen's University of Belfast.

In 1855 he was elected a Fellow of the Royal Society of Edinburgh, his proposer being his former tutor, John Hutton Balfour. He served as the society's vice president from 1877 to 1882. He was elected a Fellow of the Royal Society of London in 1869.

In 1860 was transferred to the chair of natural history at the same institution. In 1868 he assumed the duties of professor of botany at the Royal College of Science, Dublin, and finally in 1870 he received the natural history chair at the University of Edinburgh. Here he taught Arthur Conan Doyle.

In 1871–72 he served as President of the Botanical Society of Edinburgh.

Interests
Thomson is remembered for his studies of the biological conditions of the deep seas. They showed that animal life existed down to depths of 650 fathoms (1200 m), that all marine invertebrate groups are present at this depth, and that deep-sea temperatures are not as constant as had been supposed, but vary considerably, and indicate oceanic circulation. These results were described in The Depths of the Sea, which he published in 1873.

Challenger expedition

Wyville Thomson was selected as chief scientist, and the ship sailed on 23 December 1872.

Aftermath
The Challenger expedition was deemed a great success, and on his return Thomson received a number of academic honours, as well as a knighthood. In 1877 he published in two volumes The Voyage of the ChallengerThe Atlantic, a preliminary account of the results of the voyage. He spent the next two years working on administrative duties connected with the publication of the full monograph of the voyage. Thomson had a highly strung mentality, and his health was generally poor throughout his life. He found dealing with publishers in the course of completing the full reports of the voyage to be enormously stressful. In 1879 he ceased to perform his university duties, gave up overseeing the reports of the expedition in 1881 (after publishing the introduction to the zoological series in 1880), then took to his bed and died a broken man at Bonsyde on 10 March 1882. Thomson's friend and colleague Sir John Murray took over the publication of the reports; they eventually spanned 50 volumes, the last of which was issued in 1895.

Thomson is commemorated in the stained glass window above the altar in St. Michael's Parish Church, Linlithgow and his headstone is in the churchyard. In addition the Wyville-Thomson Ridge in the North Atlantic Ocean is named after him.

Evolution
Thomson had criticised natural selection, stating it was not enough to explain the evolution of species. Replying in the Nature journal, Charles Darwin commented that "I am sorry to find that Sir Wyville Thomson does not under stand the principle of natural selection, as explained by Mr. Wallace and myself... Can Sir Wyville Thomson name any one who has said that the evolution of species depends only on natural selection?"

Publications

Family
In 1853 he married Jane Ramage Dawson. They were parents to Frank Wyville Thomson  (1860–1918).

Taxon named in his honor 
The Pallid sculpin, Cottunculus thomsonii (Günther, 1882) is named after him.

See also
 European and American voyages of scientific exploration

References

Further reading

External links

1830 births
1882 deaths
19th-century Scottish scientists
19th-century British zoologists
People from Linlithgow
People from West Lothian
People educated at Merchiston Castle School
Alumni of the University of Edinburgh
Academics of the University of Aberdeen
Academics of Queens College Cork
Academics of Queen's University Belfast
Academics of the University of Edinburgh
Knights Bachelor
Royal Medal winners
Fellows of the Royal Society of Edinburgh
Fellows of the Royal Society
Members of the Royal Irish Academy
Fellows of the Geological Society of London
Fellows of the Linnean Society of London
Fellows of the Zoological Society of London
Scottish botanists
Scottish explorers
Scottish geologists
Scottish knights
Scottish marine biologists
Marine zoologists
19th-century Scottish medical doctors
Scottish naturalists
Scottish non-fiction writers
Scottish travel writers
Scottish zoologists